Sisto Joseph Averno (May 12, 1925 – March 26, 2012) was an American football guard and linebacker who played in the National Football League for the original Baltimore Colts (1950), the New York Yanks (1951), Dallas Texans (1952) and the Baltimore Colts (1953–1954). He was the final pick of the 1951 NFL Draft, serving as that draft's Mr. Irrelevant. Sisto's college football career also earned him recognition as a member of the Muhlenberg College Athletic Hall of Fame.

In his five years with the Colts, Averno's starting pay was $4,000. The most he ever made in one season was $9,500. Sisto would usually play the whole game as a member of the offensive line, linebacker, kickoff and punt teams.

He also had a reputation for playing while injured. According to Sisto: "One time, I separated my shoulder," Averno said. "I told the coach, Clem Crowe. He said, 'Block with the other one.'"

Later in life
In his later years, Sisto suffered a stroke, had his knee and a hip replaced, and he also required the use of a walker to get around. These conditions are thought to be linked to injuries he suffered during his playing years. Because of these health conditions, Averno became an advocate for better benefits to retired NFL players.

References

External links

1925 births
2012 deaths
Players of American football from Paterson, New Jersey
Baltimore Colts players
Baltimore Colts (1947–1950) players
Dallas Texans (NFL) players
New York Yanks players
Muhlenberg Mules football players